Ein al-Zeitun, also spelled Ein Zaytun, Ein ez-Zeitun, Ain al-Zaytun or Ain el-Zeitun, was a Palestinian Arab village, located  north of Safed in the Upper Galilee. During the early Ottoman period, Ein el-Zeitun had a mixed population of Muslims and Jews. Later, in the 19th century, it became entirely Muslim. The village's small population and land area as well as its proximity to Safad made it a suburb of the city. In 1945, the village had a population of 820 inhabitants and a total land area of 1,100 dunams. The village was depopulated in 1948, after the Ein al-Zeitun massacre.

Location

History
Wadi al-Dilb may have been the wadi that Al-Dimashqi (d. 1327) called Wadi Dulayba, which he described as lying between Meiron and Safed. Al-Dimashqi described a spring where water gushed forward for one or two hours, allowing people to collect drinking water and wash, before it abruptly retreated. The village name, which was Arabic for "spring of olives", did indicate that there was a spring in the vicinity.

Ottoman era
Under the Ottoman Empire in the 16th century, Ein al-Zeitun was a town in the nahiya ("subdistrict") of Jira, part of Sanjak Safad, with a mixed population of Muslims and Jews. Tax registers in 1596 recorded 59 Muslim households and 6 bachelors, plus 45 Jewish households and 3 bachelors; an estimated total of 622 inhabitants. The villagers paid taxes on olives, grapes, wheat and barley, as well as on vineyards and orchards; a total of 3,600 akçe.

The village was destroyed, along with Safed and other nearby villages, in an earthquake in 1837. In 1838, Robinson passed by and noted: "the large village Ain ez-Zeitun with its fine vineyards, north of Safed. The village at the distance had a thrifty appearance, although it was laid in ruins by the earthquake." 

Victor Guérin, who visited in 1875, found a village with two springs, surrounded by slopes covered in olives, figs, walnuts and vegetables. The population consisted of 350 Muslims.

In 1881, the PEF's Survey of Western Palestine (SWP) described Ain al Zeitun as a stone-built village on top of a hill north of Safad. The village had then a population of 200–350, and it was surrounded by arable land.

A population list from about 1887 showed Ain ez Zeitun to have about 775 inhabitants, all Muslim.

British Mandate era
In the 1922 census of Palestine conducted by the British Mandate authorities, 'Ain Zaitun had a population of 386, all Muslims, increasing in the 1931 census to 567, still all Muslims, in a total of 127 houses.

The town contained a mosque and a boys' elementary school. The villagers cultivated olives, grain and fruit, especially grapes. In the 1944/45 statistics, with a population of 820 Muslims, a total of 280 dunums of village land was used for cereals, 477 dunums were irrigated or used for orchards,  while 35 dunams were classified as urban (built-up) land.

1948 War and aftermath

According to Ilan Pappé, the Jewish troops followed a policy of massacres in villages close to Arab urban centres, in order to precipitate the flight of the people in the cities and towns nearby. This was the case of Nasir al-Din near Tiberias, Ein al-Zeitun near Safad, and Tirat Haifa near Haifa. In all villages groups of "males between the age of 10 and 50", were executed in order to intimidate and terrorise the village population and those living in nearby towns.

Ein al-Zeitun was captured by Palmach troops on May 2, 1948. Immediately prior to the capture, most of the young and middle-aged males fled the town. The remaining population was expelled by Israeli forces in the following days. Between 30 and 70 unarmed Arab prisoners were killed afterwards. One man, Rashid Khalil, was killed after a group of the village's inhabitants attempted to return to Ein al-Zeitun.

Palestinian historian Walid Khalidi, describing the place in 1992, found that:The rubble of destroyed stone houses is scattered throughout the site, which is otherwise overgrown with olive trees and cactuses [cacti]. A few deserted houses remain, some with round arched entrances and tall windows with various arched designs. In one of the remaining houses, the smooth stone above the entrance arch is inscribed with Arabic calligraphy, a fixture of Palestinian architecture. The well and the village spring also remain. 

In 2004 the remains of the Ein al-Zeitun mosque was turned into a milk farm. The Jewish owner removed the stone that indicated the founding date of the mosque and covered the walls with Hebrew graffiti.

Portrayals in art
Oral histories from Ein al-Zeitun provided Elias Khoury with material for his 1998 book Bab al Shams (Gate of the Sun), which was filmed in 2004.

Israeli author Netiva Ben-Yehuda was in the village when the massacre happened, and wrote the following about it:

But Yehonathan continued to yell, and suddenly he turned with his back to Mairke, and walked away furiously, all the time continuing to complain: "He is out of his mind! Hundreds of people are lying there tied! Go and kill them! Go and waste hundreds of people! A madman kills people bound like this and only a madman wastes all the ammunition on them!...I don´t know who they had in mind, who is coming to inspect them, but I understand it's become urgent, suddenly we have to untie the knots around these POW’s hands and legs, and then I realized they are all dead, "problem solved".

See also
Depopulated Palestinian locations in Israel
Biriya Forest
Ein Zeitim

References

Bibliography

External links
Welcome to Ayn-al-Zaytun
'Ayn al-Zaytun, Zochrot
Survey of Western Palestine, Map 4: IAA, Wikimedia commons
Ayn al-Zaytun, at Khalil Sakakini Cultural Center
Ayn al-Zaytun, Dr. Khalil Rizk.
3ein Al-Zaytoon, from Dr. Moslih Kanaaneh

Arab villages depopulated during the 1948 Arab–Israeli War
District of Safad
Historic Jewish communities
Ancient Jewish settlements of Galilee